María de Jesús Vásquez Vásquez (December 20, 1920 – April 3, 2010), known by the pseudonym La Reina y Señora de la Canción Criolla, was a virtuoso Peruvian singer.

She was daughter of Pedro Vásquez Chávez and María Jesús Vásquez Vásquez. Her particular singing style captivated listeners, as her intensity had the feel of Peruvian creole taste. 

She appeared in some Peruvian films of the 1930s, such as Gallo de mi Galpón (1938).

Jesús Vásquez died in Maison de Sante, Lima. Peruvian President Alan García declared one day of national mourning.

Discography 
 Jesús Vásquez con la Guitarra de Óscar Avilés
 Ayer, Hoy y Siempre... Jesús Vasquez
 Los Hits de Jesús Vásquez
 Retrato Musical
 En Ecuador, Canta Pasillos
 Reina de la Canción Criolla
 Interpreta a Felipe Pinglo
 Canciones de Oro
 Mensaje de Peruanidad
 La Voz Incomparable
 La Historia de...
 La Reina y su Corte
 Aeroperú presenta sus Mejores Pasillos
 Jesús Vasquez y Víctor Dávalos, Cantan Juntos
 Tres Estrellas con Enrique Lynch
 En Nueva York

Filmography 
 Gallo de mi galpón (Amauta Films - 1938)
 El guapo del pueblo (Amauta Films - 1938)
 Palomillas del Rímac (Amauta Films - 1938)
 Bala de plata (Alfa films - 1959)

References 

1920 births
2010 deaths
Singers from Lima
20th-century Peruvian women singers
20th-century Peruvian singers